In Hinduism, there are diverse approaches to conceptualizing God and gender. Many Hindus focus upon impersonal Absolute (Brahman) which is genderless. Other Hindu traditions conceive God as bigender (both female and male), alternatively as either male or female, while cherishing gender henotheism, that is without denying the existence of other Gods in either gender.

The Shakti tradition conceives of God as a female. Other Bhakti traditions of Hinduism have both male and female gods. In ancient and medieval Indian mythology, each masculine deva of the Hindu pantheon is partnered with a feminine who is often a devi.

History

Male and female deities are extensively mentioned in the Vedas. The earliest mandalas ("Books"; the authorship of each mandala is traditionally ascribed to a particular rishi or that rishi'''s family) of the Rigveda, estimated to have been composed sometime in the 2nd millennium BCE, invoke and praise both gods and goddesses. Ushas ("Goddess of Dawns") is praised in twenty Hymns of Chapters VI.64, VI.65, VII.78 and X.172, with Hymn VI.64.5 declaring goddess Ushas as the one who must be worshipped first.Rigveda Hymn VI.64.5, HH Wilson (Translator), Trubner & Co London, page 7

Goddesses, other than Ushas, mentioned in early Vedic literature include Prthivi (earth), Aditi (mother of gods, abundance), Sarasvati (river, nourishment), Vac (sound and speech), and Nirrti (death, destruction). Similarly male gods feature prominently in the Vedas, with Indra (rain, lightning), Agni (fire), Varuna (rta, law), Dyaus (sky, virility), Savitr (Surya, sun), and Soma (drink) some of the most mentioned. The two deities most mentioned in Rigveda are Indra and Agni, both male. Surya is the third most revered god, again a male. Each is mentioned, anywhere rain and fire is evoked. They are profusely praised, with ceremonies and prayers to all gods and goddesses symbolically organized around fire (Agni yajna). The hymns seek strengthening of fire, and it is god Indra who increases the energy of the fire, while god Surya increases his brightness.  Max Muller states that, while there are difference in frequency of mentions, gods and goddesses in Rig veda are "neither superior nor inferior; almost every one is represented as supreme and absolute".

Gross states that ancient and medieval Hindu literature is richly endowed with gods, goddesses and androgynous representations of God. This, states Gross, is in contrast with several monotheistic religions, where God is often synonymous with "He" and theism is replete with male anthropomorphisms. In Hinduism, goddess-imagery does not mean loss of male-god, rather the ancient literature presents the two genders as balancing each other and complementary. The Goddesses in Hinduism, states Gross, are strong, beautiful and confident, symbolizing their vitality in cycle of life. While masculine Gods are symbolically represented as those who act, the feminine Goddesses are symbolically portrayed as those who inspire action. Goddesses in Hinduism are envisioned as the patrons of arts, culture, nurture, learning, arts, joys, spirituality and liberation.

God is not either male or female concept in ancient Indian literature. Androgynous concepts of god are common place as well.

Brahman
Most major schools of Hindu philosophy focus their philosophical discourse on the Universal Absolute, called Brahman, which is a grammatically genderless noun. This Universal Absolute, states Zimmer, is "beyond the differentiating qualifications of sex, beyond any and all limitations, individualizing characteristics whatsoever". The Brahman is the Great Cosmic Spirit, the Ultimate True Reality, the Supreme Self. It is a transcendental concept that includes all virtues, forms, genders, characteristics, capacities, knowledge and being-ness. The history of the genderless concept of Brahman, as the omnipresent Absolute Spirit and Supreme Self, can be traced back to Vedas, and extensively in the earliest Upanishads, such as hymns 1.4.10 and 4.4.5 of Brihadaranyaka Upanishad, and hymn 6.2.1 of Chandogya Upanishad 6.2.1.

Zimmer clarifies the notion of gender in Sanskrit language and its relation to the concepts of Brahman and God in Hinduism, as follows:

Mythology
Hindu mythology incorporates numerous devas (gods) and devis (goddesses). These are symbolic stories that synthesize God and gender, with ideas and values. The Vishnu Purana, for example, recites one such myth describes gods and goddesses with names that are loaded with symbolism. An excerpt of the story is as follows,

Examples

 Smarta and Advaita 
The Smarta tradition, which by and large, follows Advaita philosophy believes all forms, male and female, to be different forms of the impersonal Absolute, Brahman which is of neuter gender and can never be defined.
Brahman is viewed as without personal attributes (Nirguna Brahman) or with attributes (Saguna Brahman, equated with Ishvara) as God. In Advaita Vedanta, Ishvara is Brahman. Thus according to Smarta views, the divine can be with attributes, Saguna Brahman, and also be viewed with whatever attributes, (e.g., a goddess) a devotee conceives.

Shiva and Vishnu
In Vaishnavism and Shaivism,Shaivam – An Introduction God, Vishnu or Shiva respectively, is personified as male. God, however, transcends gender in these sub-schools, and the male form is used as an icon to help focus the Puja (worship). The use of icons is not restricted to male forms. It takes various forms and shapes. The Shaivites and Vaishnavites worship God in non-anthropomorphic, symbolic male-female images as well, such as the linga-yoni and Saligram respectively. In their literature, the principle of God's true nature as sexless is emphasized as in the Vishnu sahasranama.

Thus, the first few names, of Vishnu sahasranama, in particular, do not describe features of Vishnu in detail and hence are not anthropomorphic.

 Shakti 
Shaktism, on the other hand, is a denomination of Hinduism that worships Shakti, or Devi Mata—the Hindu name for the Great Divine Mother—in all of her forms whilst not rejecting the importance of masculine and neuter divinity (which are however deemed to be inactive in the absence of the Shakti). In pure Shaktism, the Great Goddess, or Devi, is worshiped. N. N. Bhattacharyya explained that "[those] who worship the Supreme Deity exclusively as a Female Principle are called Shakta.

Alternative interpretations of Shaktism, however—primarily those of Shaivite scholars, such as Satguru Sivaya Subramuniyaswami—argue that the feminine manifest is ultimately only the vehicle through which the masculine Un-manifest Parasiva is ultimately reached.

 Radha Krishna 

The common separation of Shakti (Energy) and Shaktiman (Energetic) principle in god arrives at the conclusion that both Shakti and Shaktiman are the same. Every masculine form of god has their partner, female counterpart (shakti) and without this divine energy he is sometimes viewed as the one without the essential power. In some Bhakti schools, devotees of Hinduism worship both the genders together as the divine couple rather than a specific gender.Kakoli Basak, (1991) Rabindranath Tagore, a Humanist - p. 11

From the Vaishnava point of view, the divine feminine energy (Shakti) implies a divine source of energy of the masculine aspect of God, "Sita relates to Rama; Lakshmi belongs to Narayana; Radha has Her Krishna." The female, in these divine pairs, is viewed as the source of energy and essence of the male form.Dave Symmons (1998), This is Hinduism, Nelson Thornes, page 20

One of the prominent features of Vaishnavism in Manipur is the worship of the two genders together. Devotees do not worship Krishna or Radha alone, but they worship Radha-Krishna together. Rasa'' and other dances are a feature of the regional folk and religious tradition and often the dancer portrays both Krishna and his consort Radha in the same piece.

See also
 God and gender
 Radha Krishna
 Ardhanarishvara
 Ardhanari
 Sky father
 Feminism
 God
 Goddess
 Conceptions of God

Notes

References

External links

Hindu law
Hindu philosophical concepts
Hinduism and society
Gender and Hinduism